This article provides details of international football games played by the Malaysia national football team from 2010 to 2019.

Results

2010

2011

2012

2013

2014

2015

2016

2017

2018

2019

Note
 1: Non FIFA 'A' international match
 XI: Malaysia uses a selection of players from the Malaysia Super League, Using the name Malaysia XI

References

Notes

Football in Malaysia
Malaysia national football team results
2010s in Malaysian sport